The following is a list of people of Lebanese descent living in the Caribbean.

Curaçao
This is a list of individuals born in Curaçao of Lebanese ancestry or people of Lebanese and Dutch dual nationality who live or lived in Curaçao.

Isa, Ramez J(orge), byname Ronchi Isa (b. Oct. 17, 1917, Curaçao - d. March 17, 2005, Curaçao), prime minister of the Netherlands Antilles (1971, 1972–73)
Emily de Jongh-Elhage, former Prime Minister of the now defunct Netherlands Antilles
Abdul Nasser El Hakim, Curaçaoan businessman, politician and Minister of Economic Affairs

Dominican Republic
This is a list of individuals born in Dominican Republic of Lebanese ancestry or people of Lebanese and Dominican dual nationality who live or lived in the Dominican Republic.

 Rafael Abinader, Vice-President of the Dominican Revolutionary Party, career politician and writer
 Luis Abinader, politician, President of the Dominican Republic
 Yvonne Chahín Sasso, businesswoman and senator
 Jacobo Majluta Azar, former President
 Amelia Vega, Miss Dominican Republic 2002 and Miss Universe 2003
 Elías Wessin y Wessin, military commander and politician
 Sandra Zaiter, Dominican–Puerto Rican actress and television personality

Haiti
This is a list of individuals born in Haiti of Lebanese ancestry or people of Lebanese or Haitian nationality who live or lived in Haiti.

André Apaid, businessman
John Boulos, professional soccer player
Reginald Boulos, businessman and political activist 
Roger Jaar, businessman
Robert Malval, Prime Minister of Haiti (1993−1994)

Jamaica
This is a list of individuals born in Jamaica of Lebanese ancestry or people of Lebanese and Jamaican dual nationality who live or lived in Jamaica.

 Edward Seaga, former Prime Minister of Jamaica
Lisa Hanna, Miss Jamaica and Miss World 1993
 Shahine Robinson (née Fakhourie), Jamaica Labour Party politician

Puerto Rico
This is a list of individuals born in Puerto Rico of Lebanese ancestry or people of Lebanese, American, and/or Puerto Rican nationality who live or lived in Puerto Rico.

 Gilbert Mamery, television personality
 Gricel Mamery, television personality
 Charlie Masso, singer, model, and actor, former member of boy band Menudo
 Gildo Masso, entrepreneur, founder of Masso Enterprises
 Sandra Zaiter, Dominican–Puerto Rican actress and television personality

See also
List of Lebanese people
List of Lebanese people in the Netherlands
List of Lebanese people (diaspora)

References

Lebanese Caribbean
Caribbean

Lebanese